Castilleja parviflora is a species of Indian paintbrush known by the common name mountain Indian paintbrush. It is native to western North America from Alaska to California, where it grows in high mountain habitat, including areas of alpine climate.

Description
This wildflower is a perennial herb up to about 40 centimeters tall and coated in glandular and nonglandular hairs. The leaves are a few centimeters long and lance-shaped to oblong. The inflorescence is made up of layers of bracts tipped in shades of pale yellow to bright red or pink. Between the bracts emerge the yellow-green, sometimes red-tinted, tubular flowers. Flowers bloom June to September. Its habitats include gravels, talus slopes, and subalpine and alpine meadows.

Varieties
There are several varieties of Castilleja parviflora:
C. p. var. albida - limited to British Columbia and Washington
C. p. var. olympica (Olympic Indian paintbrush) - limited to British Columbia and Washington
C. p. var. oreopola (Henry Indian paintbrush) - distributed from British Columbia to Oregon
C. p. var. parviflora - known from Alaska to California

References

External links

Jepson Manual Treatment: Castilleja parviflora
Castilleja parviflora Photo gallery

parviflora
Flora of the Western United States
Flora of California
Flora of Canada
Plants described in 1840
Flora without expected TNC conservation status